Eliot station is a light rail station on the MBTA Green Line D branch located just north of Route 9 (Boylston Street) between the Newton Highlands and Newton Upper Falls villages of Newton, Massachusetts. The station has a parking lot at the end of Lincoln Street, a pedestrian entrance from Meredith Avenue, and pedestrian entrances from both sides of Route 9. A footbridge, built in 1977, crosses Route 9 adjacent to the railroad bridge.

Accessibility
In 2019, the MBTA indicated that the four remaining non-accessible stops on the D branch were "Tier I" accessibility priorities. A preliminary design contract for accessibility modifications at the four stations was issued in February 2021. Design reached 75% in June 2022 and was completed late that year. Construction was expected to be advertised in February 2023 and begin midyear.

References

External links

MBTA - Eliot
 Google Maps Street View: Lincoln Street entrance, Boylston Street entrance

Green Line (MBTA) stations
Railway stations in Middlesex County, Massachusetts
Railway stations in the United States opened in 1959
Former Boston and Albany Railroad stations